Fernando Albert Derveld (born 22 October 1976 in Vlissingen) is a retired Dutch footballer. He played as  left back.

Club career
Derveld began his career in his home country the Netherlands, playing for the youth teams of Walcheren and PSV Eindhoven, before he made his senior debut with Willem II in the 1995-96 season. After three seasons at Willem II, he moved on to HFC Haarlem, where he stayed for one and a half years. He had a trial with English club Norwich City F.C. in early 2000, though the then City manager Bruce Rioch declined to offer him a contract. Rioch's successor at Norwich - Bryan Hamilton - did give him a contract when he took over towards the end of the 1999-00 season.

In total, Derveld played 25 games for Norwich, scoring one goal in a 3-2 win at West Bromwich Albion. He struggled to find form and was not held in high esteem by City supporters. When Hamilton left the club in late 2000, his successor - Nigel Worthington - made it clear that Derveld did not figure in his plans, and after a loan spell at West Bromwich Albion, his contract with Norwich was terminated in the summer of 2001.

He moved on to play for Odense BK in the Danish Superliga, under head coach Troels Bech. While playing in a UEFA Cup match for Odense BK against Celta Vigo in 2002, Derveld scored from a free-kick and was then sent off moments later. Derveld was ever-present in the Odense starting formation, and in the summer 2005, he moved back to the Netherlands to play for SC Heerenveen. Following a mediocre season at Heerenveen, he returned to Denmark, where he re-united with Bech at Esbjerg fB. Summer 2008 Derveld and Esbjerg fB agreed to cancel the player contract.

In summer 2008 he moved to FC Dordrecht, but he was already released by the club in November that year.

Derveld as a painter 
Fernando has painted a few paintings. A couple of paintings were painted for a charity auction in Esbjerg in 2006.

References

External links
 Esbjerg fB profile
Career stats at Danmarks Radio
Career information at Flown from the Nest

1976 births
Living people
Sportspeople from Vlissingen
Association football fullbacks
Dutch footballers
PSV Eindhoven players
Willem II (football club) players
HFC Haarlem players
Norwich City F.C. players
West Bromwich Albion F.C. players
Odense Boldklub players
SC Heerenveen players
Esbjerg fB players
FC Dordrecht players
Eredivisie players
Eerste Divisie players
English Football League players
Danish Superliga players
Dutch expatriate footballers
Expatriate footballers in England
Expatriate men's footballers in Denmark
Dutch expatriate sportspeople in England
Dutch expatriate sportspeople in Denmark
Footballers from Zeeland